The Zangwills are a UK based indie rock band from Cheshire. The band members are Jake Vickers (vocals, guitar & synths) Sam Davies (lead guitar) Ed Dowling (bass) and Adam Spence (drums) they formed in June 2017, releasing their first single, New Heights in December the same year.

Background 
Vickers, Dowling and Davies met while attending Sir John Deane's College in Northwich, and they were joined by drummer Spence who was a former school friend of Vickers's. They recorded their first demos while studying at the college playing their first gig together on 3 June 2017 at a small festival near Chester.

The band’s debut EP, It’s Really up to You was released on 3 September 2018. The Horrors of Sobriety was released as a single on 30 March 2018,. The next single Patio Paradise also gained media praise. Their 2nd EP In Amongst the Glitter was released in September 2019. Their first post Covid lock-down release in 2020 was the single Could I on 23 October, opening with the lyric, Hello are you ok? described as "An anthem dedicated to a longing for human connection and perhaps the most relatable single of the year thus far."  2021 saw the release of Never Looked Back, particularly well received in US territories it featured in various indie charts, including a California based one where the song remained consistently from September to December, reaching No 1 and being added to the best songs in their end of year feature.

The band release their music independently but work closely alongside AWAL the independent Artist division of Kobalt Music Group.

Frontman Vickers said in 2018 that the band's name was chosen from the name of a street in Greenwich, London near where his sister once lived.

Reception
The Zangwills have been described as fitting, "smoothly into the era of early noughties indie-rock fronted by Arctic Monkeys with other sounds coming through of The Courteeners." The band have also been described as being, "like nothing else out there, an immensely valuable quality when so many bands disappear into a slurry of sameness." They cite their influences as David Bowie, The Cure, Patti Smith and The Strokes. The band are known for their indie anthems and energetic live shows.

Their 2020 single release Could I gained praise from national and international media including, "Their latest single ‘Could I’ is a work of art.".

Talking about the song, Jake Vickers said, "If you listen to it loud enough, it can feel like a hug,” he said. “If you smash it on some speakers and put them on your chest, it might just feel like human contact."  It was this universal message, coming late in 2020 that grabbed the support and attention of a wider global audience "Fans worldwide will have carved out national treasure status for this band. They really rock" from the USA   and "The UK does not stop producing bands that immediately make us fall in love, for example, The Zangwills." from Germany

Public attention and media comments such as "The Zangwills have proven their capability to consistently produce engaging indie-rock bangers"  led to them passing the early milestone of a million streams on Spotify. The Band also receive consistent support from BBC Radio Merseyside and BBC Music Introducing and BBC 6's Mark Radcliffe said he, 'loved the sound and the big, chiming guitars' after interviewing the band mid-set during a performance for Sky TV's, programme Live From The Edge.

The official music video for the band's song Judas on the Dancefloor was produced by actor and filmmaker, Maisie Williams, well known for her role in Game of Thrones, along with BAFTA winning Director Lowri Roberts. Featuring Zoe Villiers in the lead role, it was released in April 2021. The song is about the issues of groping, spiking and harassment on nights out, the band also work with the organisation Girls Against to raise awareness. The video went on to win the award for Best International Music Video at Focus Wales Film Festival (2022).

Included in various end of year round ups at the close of 2021, these included US-based All Music Magazine'''s renowned music photographers featuring them among their best gigs of the year across the UK & Europe  and Actor Robert Carlyle selecting the band's single Never Looked Back among his favourite 50 songs of the year. 

 Live 
Their headline dates have included sold out shows at Manchester Academy Gorilla and Chester Live Rooms. The band played their first Scottish date at Sneaky Pete's, Edinburgh in January 2019 and their first London date on 22 May 2019. In November 2021 they played dates on the South Coast and at The Ritz Manchester. Support slots have included artists as diverse as Yungblud and a satellite support for The Charlatans at their North by Northwich takeover event in May 2018.  The band played Northwich again Christmas 2018. The Zangwills have also shared a stage with Fun Lovin' Criminals, 80's legends ABC and played at Rivfest, the Warrington Music Festival created in memory of Viola Beach. In February 2021, bassist Ed Dowling, along with other Warrington-based musicians, featured on a charity single to mark the 5th Anniversary of Viola Beach's accident.

They were also joined regularly onstage in 2021 by Jess Lees, providing harmonies and backing vocals after she featured on the recording of the band's single Call.''

Band members 
Jack Vickers - vocals, guitar, synth
Sam Davies - lead guitar
Ed Dowling - bass, backing vocals
Adam Spence - drums and percussion

References

External links 
The Zangwills Official Site
Sunday Club #19

English indie rock groups
Musical groups from Cheshire
English rock music groups
Musical groups established in 2017
Musical quartets
British indie rock groups
2017 establishments in England